A subscriber to a channel on the video-sharing YouTube is a user who has chosen to receive the channel's content by clicking on that channel's "Subscribe" button, and each user's subscription feed consists of videos published by channels to which the user is subscribed. The ability to subscribe to users was introduced in October 2005. YouTube began publishing a list of its most-subscribed channels in April 2006. An early archive of the list dates to May 2006.

Since mid-2006, when Smosh occupied the top position with less than 3,000 subscribers, at least 10 other YouTube channels have held the top spot; these include American fictional character Bree Avery, American comedian Brooke "Brookers" Brodack, American fictional character Fred Figglehorn, Swedish gamer Felix "PewDiePie" Kjellberg, American comedian Ryan Higa, American media personality Ray William Johnson, American public speaker Judson Laipply, and English geriatric Peter Oakley.

The most-subscribed channel is that of Indian record label T-Series, which hosts its music videos on its channel. With over 235 million subscribers as of February 2023, the channel has held the top position since April 14, 2019. The most-subscribed channel which does not belong to an organization or company is that of American YouTuber MrBeast, who is also the fourth most-subscribed channel overall, with over 137 million subscribers as of March 2023.

50 most-subscribed channels
The following table lists the 50 most-subscribed YouTube channels, as well as the primary language and content category of each channel. The channels are ordered by number of subscribers; those whose displayed subscriber counts are identical are listed so that the channel whose current growth rate indicates that its displayed subscriber count will exceed that of the other channel is listed first. Automatically generated channels that lack their own videos (such as Music and News) and channels that have been made effectively obsolete as a result of the transferral of their content (such as JustinBieberVEVO and TaylorSwiftVEVO) are excluded. As of February 2023, 21 of the 50 channels listed primarily produce content in English while 16 primarily produce content in Hindi.
All 50 of the channels have surpassed 40 million subscribers, 39 of them have surpassed 50 million subscribers, 23 of them have surpassed 60 million subscribers, 16 of them have surpassed 70 million subscribers, 12 of them have surpassed 80 million subscribers, 10 of them have surpassed 90 million and 7 of them have surpassed 100 million subscribers. Only 1 channel (T-Series) has surpassed 200 million subscribers.

Historical progression of most-subscribed channels
The following table lists the 19 distinct runs as the most-subscribed YouTube channel recorded since May 2006. Only runs lasting at least 24 hours are included. 11 different channels have held the position, with PewDiePie holding the title a record four times. In second place is Smosh, which held it three times, while third place is tied between nigahiga, T-Series, and YouTube's own channel, which have all held it twice each.

Timeline
Timeline of the most-subscribed YouTube channels (May 2006 – present)

Milestones and reactions

Following the third time that Smosh became the most-subscribed YouTube channel, Ray William Johnson collaborated with the duo. A flurry of top YouTubers including Ryan Higa, Shane Dawson, Felix Kjellberg, Michael Buckley, Kassem Gharaibeh, the Fine Brothers, and Johnson himself, congratulated the duo shortly after they surpassed Johnson as the most-subscribed channel.

PewDiePie vs T-Series

In mid-2018, the subscriber count of the Indian music video channel T-Series rapidly approached that of Swedish web comedian and Let's Player PewDiePie, who was the most-subscribed user on YouTube at the time. As a result, fans of PewDiePie and T-Series, other YouTubers, and celebrities showed their support for both channels. During the competition, both channels gained a large number of subscribers at a rapid rate, and surpassed each other's subscriber count on multiple occasions in February, March, and April 2019. T-Series eventually permanently surpassed PewDiePie, and on May 29, it became the first channel to gain 100 million subscribers.

See also

 List of most-subscribed YouTube Music artists
 List of most-viewed YouTube channels
 List of most-viewed YouTube videos
 List of most-liked YouTube videos
 List of most-disliked YouTube videos
 List of most-viewed online videos in the first 24 hours
 List of YouTubers

Notes

References

YouTube Subscribers
Youtube channels

Subscribed Users